Aldinga Scrub Conservation Park is a protected area in the Australian state of South Australia located in the suburb of Aldinga Beach  about  south by west of the state capital of Adelaide.

History
Before British colonisation of South Australia, the Kaurna people occupied the land from the Adelaide plains and southwards down western side of the Fleurieu Peninsula. There was a camp at Aldinga known as Camp Coortandillah, and Kaurna people were present living in the Aldinga Scrub until the 1870s, when Bishop Augustus Short  sent the remaining people to the mission at Poonindie, thus ending their occupation of the area. After they were removed, some Aboriginal people from the Goolwa area (Ngarrindjeri people) occupied the area. The Kaurna language name of Aldinga was Ngaltingga.

The first European settler, Mr. F. Culley, arrived on the scrubland in 1857. Much effort was made to farm on the land before the World War I, but they all proved futile. The District Council of Willunga feared that the area may cause erosion and thus  were purchased to be supervised by the State Planning Authority as an open space reserve.  

The conservation park was proclaimed for the purpose of protecting a parcel of undeveloped land considered to be "a significant remnant of the natural habitat that once occurred all along the southern Adelaide coastline".

Description
The conservation park consists of land in the cadastral unit of the Hundred of Willunga consisting of section 821 and land identified as allotments 4, 14, 15 and 100. It came into existence on 7 November 1985 by proclamation under the National Parks and Wildlife Act 1972 in respect to section 821. The remainder of the land holding was proclaimed on 14 March 1991.

It is positioned in the Willunga sub-basin and is characterised by a backdrop of sand dunes, sand blows and small coastal vegetation. The Park consists of an extensive range of rare plants and is considered as an important region for the conservation of flora and fauna. Some of the rare plants include Lacy coral lichen, nardoo, hairy sedge and various species of orchids. Short-beaked echidnas, lizards, bats and several birds form a part of its ecosystem.

The conservation park is classified as an IUCN Category III protected area.

See also
 List of protected areas in Adelaide

References

External links
Official webpage
Friends of Aldinga Scrub
Webpage on the BirdsSA website
Webpage on the Protected Planet website

Conservation parks of South Australia
Protected areas in Adelaide
Protected areas established in 1975